The Sikiana are an indigenous people, living in Brazil, Suriname, and Venezuela.

The Sikiana in Brazil live between the Cafuini River and headwaters of the Turuna and Itapi close to border with Suriname. The group in Suriname lives in Kwamalasamutu. The group in Venezuela is probably extinct.

The 1916 Encyclopaedia of the Dutch West Indies placed the Sikiana at the Trombetas River in Brazil, and said that they had a close relationship with the Salumá and the Tiriyó.

Name
The Sikiana are also called Chikena, Chiquena, Chiquiana, Shikiana, Sikiâna, Sikiyana, Sikiána, Sikïiyana, Tshikiana, Xikiyana, or Xikujana people.

Language
The Sikiana language belongs to the Carib language family. The people in Suriname speak Tiriyó as a second language. Some Sikiana people in Venezuela speak the Tiriyó.

Notes

Indigenous peoples in Brazil
Indigenous peoples in Suriname
Indigenous peoples of the Guianas
Hunter-gatherers of South America
Ethnic groups in Suriname